Polygala mariana, the Maryland milkwort, is a species of flowering plant in the milkwort family (Polygalaceae). It is endemic to the southern and eastern United States.

References

mariana
Flora of the United States
Taxa named by Philip Miller